The Mozambican Athletics Federation (FMA, Federação Moçambicana de Atletismo) is the governing body for the sport of athletics in Mozambique.

History 
FMA was founded in 1978, and was affiliated to the IAAF the same year.

Former president was Sarifa Magide.  She was re-elected for the period 2008-2012 in December 2008. Shafee Sidade was elected as a President between 2013 - 2017. In February 2013, Shafee Sidat was elected new president. The current President is Francisco Joaquim Manheche. He was elected in September 2017.

Affiliations 
World Athletics 
Confederation of African Athletics (CAA)
Asociación Iberoamericana de Atletismo (AIA; Ibero-American Athletics Association)
Moreover, it is part of the following national organisations:
Mozambique Olympic Committee (COM; Portuguese: Comité Olímpico de Moçambique)

National records 
FMA maintains the national records.

External links 
Official webpage (in Portuguese)

References 

Mozambique
Sport in Mozambique
National governing bodies for athletics
Sports organizations established in 1978